Raiffeisenbank refers to cooperative banks in Europe that are rooted in the early credit unions of Friedrich Wilhelm Raiffeisen. The name is found in:

 Raiffeisen Bankengruppe (Austria), Austrian group of cooperative banks.
 Raiffeisen Zentralbank Österreich, the group's former central institution
 Raiffeisen Bank International, the group's central institution, which merged with Raiffeisen Zentralbank Österreich in 2017
 Raiffeisen (Albania), the group's subsidiary in Albania
 Raiffeisenbank (Bulgaria), the group's former subsidiary in Bulgaria
 , the group's subsidiary in the Czech Republic
, the group's subsidiary in Hungary
 Raiffeisen Bank (Romania), the group's subsidiary in Romania
 Raiffeisenbank (Russia), the group's subsidiary in Russia
 Raiffeisen Bank (Serbia), the group's subsidiary in Serbia
 Raiffeisen Bank Aval, the group's subsidiary in Ukraine
 Raiffeisen-Landesbank Tirol
 Raiffeisenlandesbank Niederösterreich-Wien
 Raiffeisenlandesbank Oberösterreich
 German Cooperative Financial Group, which includes Volksbanken and Raiffeisenbanken.
 Raiffeisen Landesbank Südtirol – Cassa Centrale Raiffeisen dell'Alto Adige, South Tyrol, Italy group of cooperative banks.
 Raiffeisen (Switzerland), Swiss group of cooperative banks.
 Banque Raiffeisen, Luxembourgian group of cooperative banks.
 Rabobank (originally "Raiffeisen-Boerenleenbank"), Dutch group of cooperative banks.
 Raiffeisen Bank Bosnia i Hercegovina, the group's subsidiary in Bosnia and Herzegovina.

See also 
 Raiffeisen (disambiguation)
 KBC Bank
 Crédit Mutuel

Banks